Victor Joel Selmanowitz  was an American dermatologist. In 1970, he coined the term unilateral nevoid telangiectasia. The Victor J. Selmanowitz Memorial  Lecture and chair of modern Jewish history at the Touro College Graduate School of Jewish Studies is named for him.

Selected publications

References

American physicians